The Wagon Wheel Gap Hot Springs Resort, near Creede, Colorado, is the historic name of what is now a dude ranch, the 4UR Ranch.  It was listed on the National Register of Historic Places in 2019.  Of 26 buildings on the property, 14 were deemed to be contributing to the historic character of the listed area, and there were 4 contributing structures and a contributing object.

It was originally developed in the 1870s, with soaking pools and relatively simple lodging.  The Wagon Wheel Gap Improvement Company bought the property in the 1890s and made improvements during 1902-05 which established a "rustic character".

Artifacts include a dinner bell cast in about 1949.

Further south on the road is the Wagon Wheel Gap Fluospar Mine and Mill, on the east side of Goose Creek, which was also listed on the National Register in 2019.

References

National Register of Historic Places in Mineral County, Colorado
Dude ranches in the United States
Buildings and structures in Mineral County, Colorado
Buildings and structures completed in the 1870s